Cinclidium is the scientific name of two genera and may refer to:

Cinclidium (bird), a genus of birds in the family Muscicapidae
Cinclidium (plant), a genus of mosses in the family Mniaceae